Port Sudan Military Airport is an airport located within Port Sudan.

The airport was once a civilian airfield and replaced by Port Sudan New International Airport opened in 1992. The new airport has assumed the ICAO airport code HSSP replacing HSPN.

Port Sudan Air Base

It currently hosts Sudanese Air Force Flight School (Aeronautics College) using a number of trainer aircraft not found in the active inventory of the SAF:

 PT-6? - one lost to crash in 2017
 SAFAT-03 - a local and modified variant of the UTVA 75 built at SAFAT Aviation Complex at Wadi Seidna Air Base
 Yak-52

References

Airports in Sudan
Port Sudan